Elk Grove Airport  was a privately owned public-use airport two miles southeast of Elk Grove, in Sacramento County, California. It closed, effective 7/1/10.

Facilities
Elk Grove Airport covered 108 acres (44 ha) at an elevation of 54 feet (16 m). Its one runway, 11/29, was 2,769 by 35 feet (844 x 11 m).

In 2001 the airport averaged 82 aircraft operations per day. 64 aircraft were then based at this airport: 60 single-engine, 1 multi-engine, 1 helicopter, and 2 ultralight.

References

External links 
 Aerial image as of May 2002 from USGS The National Map

Defunct airports in California
Airports in Sacramento County, California
Elk Grove, California